Sir and Star is a restaurant founded in 2012. It is located in The Olema, a historic restaurant and inn built in 1876. The restaurant is at the corner of Sir Francis Drake Boulevard and Star Route One in Olema, California.

Early days 

The building was constructed by the area's original Spanish land grantee, Rafael Garcia, in 1876 as part of a  land grant from Mexico. John Nelson, the stage coach company owner that ran a stage from Olema to San Rafael, won the inn from Felix Garcia, Rafael's son, in a game of chance. The Nelsons owned the inn for three generations thereafter. The inn was a popular place of respite for local workers.

The name Olema has significant historical heritage originating from the over 125adjacent Miwok Indian villages. In the Miwok language, Olemaloke roughly translates to "little coyote".

During the 1906 San Francisco earthquake the road near the inn was heavily damaged. In 1910 Henry Fielding Reid of the State Earthquake Investigative Commission opined that Olema was the epicenter of the earthquake. This was later disproved, and the epicenter was found to be about 50miles north of San Francisco. The inn survived the earthquake.

Current use 

In 2010 the Olema Inn was purchased by chefs Daniel DeLong and Margaret Gradé, repainted from bright white to nearly black, and rechristened as Sir and Star at The Olema. Sir and Star is a portmanteau of Sir Francis Drake Boulevard and Star Route One.

Biography of current owners 

Until 1999 Chef DeLong worked at Elroy's, Bix, and Stars restaurants in San Francisco. Gradé was a neuropsychologist at the University of California, San Francisco (UCSF). At this point the entwined pair purchased Manka's Inverness Lodge in Inverness which was a former 1918 hunting lodge that was converted to a guest lodge with restaurant years prior to their purchase. Alice Waters a pioneer in the California cuisine movement and the founder of Chez Panisse restaurant in Berkeley mentored Gradé during this time of new beginnings and they remain good friends. Manka's was one of the 50-best hotel restaurants in the U.S. in 2003 according to Food & Wine magazine. The Zagat survey for 2007 ranked it in the top-5 of their top-30. Manka's is known as a quiet hideaway even for celebrities. Prince Charles of England (the Prince of Wales) and his new wife, Camilla, Duchess of Cornwall, previously Camilla Parker Bowles, took over the entire main lodge at Manka's during their West Marin tour of local farmers and ranchers learning the ropes of farm-to-table foraging. They were escorted on their tour by Waters and Gradé. A few months later the main lodge that they stayed in and its attached restaurant burned to the ground during a severe winter windstorm. Gradé and DeLong live in Inverness and have twins born in 2008.

References

External links 

  Sir and Star at The Olema
 Sister website Manka's Inverness Lodge

1876 establishments in California
Buildings and structures in Marin County, California
Companies based in Marin County, California
Cuisine of the Western United States
Hotels in the United States
Living people
Restaurants in the San Francisco Bay Area
West Marin
Year of birth missing (living people)